Othmane Mustapha Belfaa (born 18 October 1961) is a retired Algerian athlete who competed in the high jump. He was born in Lille, France. His personal best is 2.28m (it was a national record at that time) achieved in Amman in 1983. He finished 3rd at the 1985 IAAF World Indoor Championships in Athletics in Paris with a jump of 2.27m. He finished also 6th at the 1992 World Cup in Athletics in Havana.

International competitions

1992 Pan Arab Games - gold medal
1992 African Championships - gold medal
1991 All-Africa Games - gold medal
1991 Mediterranean Games - gold medal 
1990 African Championships - gold medal
1990 Maghreb Athletics Championships - gold medal
1989 African Championships - gold medal
1989 Arab Athletics Championships - gold medal
1987 Mediterranean Games - bronze medal 
1987 Arab Athletics Championships - gold medal
1985 IAAF World Indoor Championships - bronze medal
1983 Mediterranean Games - gold medal 
1983 Arab Athletics Championships - gold medal
1983 Maghreb Athletics Championships - gold medal

External links

1961 births
Living people
Sportspeople from Lille
Algerian male high jumpers
Olympic athletes of Algeria
Athletes (track and field) at the 1980 Summer Olympics
World Athletics Championships athletes for Algeria
African Games gold medalists for Algeria
African Games medalists in athletics (track and field)
Mediterranean Games gold medalists for Algeria
Mediterranean Games bronze medalists for Algeria
Athletes (track and field) at the 1983 Mediterranean Games
Athletes (track and field) at the 1987 Mediterranean Games
Athletes (track and field) at the 1991 Mediterranean Games
Mediterranean Games medalists in athletics
Athletes (track and field) at the 1987 All-Africa Games
Athletes (track and field) at the 1991 All-Africa Games
World Athletics Indoor Championships medalists
21st-century Algerian people